The year 1995 is the 7th year in the history of Shooto, a mixed martial arts promotion based in the Japan. In 1995, Shooto held 6 events beginning with, Shooto: Vale Tudo Access 3.

Events list

Shooto: Vale Tudo Access 3

Shooto: Vale Tudo Access 3 was an event held on January 21, 1995, at Korakuen Hall in Tokyo, Japan.

Results

Shooto: Vale Tudo Access 4

Shooto: Vale Tudo Access 4 was an event held on May 12, 1995, in Japan.

Results

Shooto: Yokohama Free Fight

Shooto: Yokohama Free Fight was an event held on June 4, 1995, in Japan.

Results

Shooto: Complete Vale Tudo Access

Shooto: Complete Vale Tudo Access was an event held on July 29, 1995, at The Omiya Skating Center in Omiya, Saitama, Japan.

Results

Shooto: Vale Tudo Perception

Shooto: Vale Tudo Perception was an event held on September 26, 1995, at Komazawa Olympic Park Gymnasium in Setagaya, Tokyo, Japan. Aside its MMA fights, it also featured an exhibition bout between Satoru Sayama and Kuniaki Kobayashi and a grappling match between Yuki Nakai and Jean-Jacques Machado.

Results

Shooto: Tokyo Free Fight

Shooto: Tokyo Free Fight was an event held on November 7, 1995, at Korakuen Hall in Tokyo, Japan.

Results

See also 
 Shooto
 List of Shooto champions
 List of Shooto Events

References

Shooto events
1995 in mixed martial arts